HMS North Star was a Royal Navy Admiralty M-class destroyer constructed and then operational in the First World War. She was sunk in April 1918.

The destroyer was launched on 9 November 1916 and completed in February 1917.

Design and construction
The M-class destroyers were designed to meet a requirement for faster destroyers than the previous Laforey-class , in order to match reported German ships. As part of its 1913–1914 shipbuilding programme, the Admiralty ordered six ships to the standard Admiralty design, together with seven builder's specials from the experienced destroyer builders Yarrow, Thornycroft and Hawthorn Leslie, to the builder's own designs. The outbreak of the First World War resulted in a series of large orders being placed for destroyers to replace expected losses, with the existing M-class being chosen for orders rather than new designs to speed production. North Star was one of four Admiralty Ms ordered from Palmers Shipbuilding and Iron Company as part of an overall order of 22 destroyers of this class under the Third Emergency War Programme in late November 1914.

Sinking
The destroyer took part in the Zeebrugge raid in April 1918 and was assigned as an escort ship, along with HMS Phoebe to guard HMS Vindictive. According to the official British Admiralty Statement on the Zeebrugge Raid, North Star lost her way in the smoke of the raid and emerged into the light of star-shells, whereupon she was sunk by coastal batteries.

Notes

References

Bibliography
 
 
 
 
 

 

World War I destroyers of the United Kingdom
1916 ships